Mulić is a Serbo-Croatian family name which is more common among Bosniaks than Croats and Serbs.

Notable people with this name include:

 Dinko Mulić (born 1983), Bosnian-born Croatian slalom canoer
 Fejsal Mulić (born 1994), Serbian footballer
 Demir Mulić (born 1993), Montenegrin cyclist
 Hamdija Mulić (1881–1944), Bosnian educator and journalist
 Malik Mulić (1917–1980), Bosnian publicist, translator, editor and academic lecturer

References 

Croatian surnames
Serbian surnames
Bosnian surnames